The Grace Museum of America is located in Cave Creek, Arizona in the mountains of the Sonoran Desert. The museum was started by Grace Voss Frederick and houses a collection of historical objects from significant times in American history. According to Frederick, the museum is intended to document America's "transition from a primitive country to a great nation". Many of the items were collected throughout Frederick's life and travels (she lived from 1905 to 2009).

The museum planning began in the early 1980s and the museum opened in the mid-1980s. The Grace Museum of America contains significant items from the last 200 years of American history.

The museum is funded by the Grace Foundation for Preservation of Americana; a non-profit organization which operated for charitable and educational purposes.

The Museum Tour 

The tour shows the transition of America across a timeline using displays that include original antiques and mannequins. The museum tour is approximately 2 hours long. The tour is guided and has live and recorded descriptions of the displays.

References 

 United States Patent 3036496
 Grace Foundation for the Preservation of Americana, Cave Creek, PlanetWare Inc. 2010
 YWCA Tribute to Women Alumnae, YWCA, 1994
 A Proud Patriot, Sonoran News, 2008
 104 Wonderful Memorable Years, Colonelpepper, 2010, January 9, 2010,  KTVK, Inc.
 Transcripts, Grant, Michael, 2003, April 21, 2003,  Horizon

External links 
 Grace Museum of America Homepage

Museums in Maricopa County, Arizona
History museums in Arizona
Museums established in the 1980s
1980s establishments in Arizona